Dəllər (also, Dəlilər, Dallyar, and Dolyar) is a village and municipality in the Shamkir Rayon of Azerbaijan.  It has a population of 4,284.

References 

Populated places in Shamkir District
Elizavetpol Governorate